The Torneo Interligas de Básquet was an international professional club basketball competition between the four best-placed teams in the top-tier level Argentine and Brazilian leagues.

History 
The presidents of the Asociación de Clubes de Basquetbol of Argentina and of the Brazilian Liga Nacional de Basquete do Brasil met on March 12, 2010 in São Paulo, Brazil, to discuss the creation of a tournament between the top clubs from both countries. The tournament was held from 2010 to 2012.

Format 
In the first stage, the eight teams were divided in two groups of four teams each. Each group had two teams from Argentina, and two teams from Brazil. One group was played in Argentina, while the other group was played in Brazil. The teams played against the other teams of their respective groups once. The winner of each group placed in the final. The finals were played in Argentina, if there was at least one Argentine team. If there were two Brazilian teams, the final was played in Brazil.

Participating teams

2010 Torneo InterLigas

2011 Torneo InterLigas

2012 Torneo InterLigas

List of champions

Performances

By club

By country

MVPs
2010:  Leonardo Gutiérrez (Peñarol Mar del Plata)
2011:  William McFarlan (Obras Sanitarias)
2012:  Leonardo Gutiérrez (Peñarol Mar del Plata)

See also
Liga Nacional de Básquet
Torneo Súper 8
Torneo Top 4
Copa Argentina
Novo Basquete Brasil

References

External links
Argentine League Official website 
Brazilian League Official website 

International club basketball competitions
Basketball competitions in Brazil
Basketball competitions in Argentina
2010 establishments in South America
2012 disestablishments in South America